Qazi Khani (also Romanized as Qāẕī Khānī; also known as Khāvand) is a village in Kakavand-e Sharqi Rural District, Kakavand District, Delfan County, Lorestan Province, Iran. At the 2006 census, its population was 341, in 71 families.

References 

Towns and villages in Delfan County